This is a List of clubs in the Landesliga Bayern-Mitte, including all clubs and their final placings from the first season in 1963–64 to 2010–11. The league, commonly referred to as the Landesliga Mitte, is the second-highest football league in the state of Bavaria and the Bavarian football league system. It is one of three Landesligas in Bavarian football, the sixth tier of the German football league system. Until the introduction of the 3. Liga in 2008 it was the fifth tier.

Overview
Since the formation of the league in 1963, it has served as the tier below the Bayernliga, together with the northern and the southern division of the Landesliga. Originally a tier-four league, it was demoted to tier-five status in 1994, when the Regionalligas were introduced. In 2008, it was then demoted to tier-six status, when the 3. Liga was established.

Originally, the Bezirksligas were the feeder leagues to the Landesliga Süd, of which there were, for the most part, six, two each in Middle Franconia, Upper Palatinate and Lower Bavaria. From 1988, Bezirksoberligas served as feeder leagues instead, having been established as a new tier between the Landesligas and the Bezirksligas. The three leagues below the Landesliga Mitte have since been the Bezirksoberliga Mittelfranken, Bezirksoberliga Oberpfalz and the Bezirksoberliga Niederbayern.

Clubs and their placings
The complete list of clubs and placings in the league since the introduction of the league in 1963:

1963–1988
The first 25 seasons from 1963 to 1988:

1988–2012
The last 24 seasons from 1988 to 2012:

Key

 S = No of seasons in league (as of 2011–12)

Notes
 1 In 1996, the SpVgg Fürth and TSV Vestenbergsgreuth merged to form SpVgg Greuther Fürth.
 2 In 1995, 1. FC Amberg was declared bankrupt and folded. A new club, the FC Amberg, was formed, initially within the TV Amberg.
 3 In 2000, Jahn Forchheim withdrew from the Bayernliga to the lower amateur leagues.
 4 In 2000, SV Riedelhütte withdrew from the league.
 5 In 1988, the Post SV Regensburg merged with TSG Süd Regensburg to form SG Post/Süd Regensburg. In 2002, SG Post/Süd Regensburg joined SSV Jahn Regensburg to become Jahn Regensburg II.
 6 In 2003 the SpVgg Grün-Weiss Deggendorf was formed through a merger of SpVgg Deggendorf and SV Grün-Weiss Deggendorf.
 7 In 1967, the ASV Nürnberg-Süd merged with the TSV Nürnberg to form SV 73 Nürnberg-Süd.
 8 In 2011, SpVgg Weiden declared insolvency in the Regionalliga and was relegated to the Bezirksoberliga Oberpfalz.

References

Sources
 Die Bayernliga 1945 – 1997,  published by the DSFS, 1998
 Deutschlands Fußball in Zahlen,  An annual publication with tables and results from the Bundesliga to Verbandsliga/Landesliga, publisher: DSFS
 Süddeutschlands Fussballgeschichte in Tabellenform 1897–1988  History of Southern German football in tables, publisher & author: Ludolf Hyll
 50 Jahre Bayrischer Fussball-Verband  50-year-anniversary book of the Bavarian FA, publisher: Vindelica Verlag, published: 1996

External links 
 Bayrischer Fussball Verband (Bavarian FA) 
 Das deutsche Fussball Archiv Historic German league tables 
 Bavarian League tables and results 
 Website with tables and results from the Bavarian Oberliga to Bezirksliga 

Mitte
2